Muroi is a Japanese surname. Notable people with the surname include:

Ichiei Muroi (born 1974), Japanese footballer
Shigeru Muroi (born 1958), Japanese actress
Kunihiko Muroi (born 1947), Japanese politician
Yuzuki Muroi (born 1970), Japanese novelist, essayist, and tarento

Japanese-language surnames